Oscar Friedrich Werndorff (1880–1938) was an Austrian art director. After leaving Germany in the early 1930s he moved to Britain where he worked in the British film industry. He co-directed the 1931 film The Bells.

Selected filmography
Art director
 The Count of Cagliostro (1920)
 The Story of a Maid (1921)
 Money in the Streets (1922)
 The Daughter of the Brigadier (1922)
 The Slipper Hero (1923)
 The Three Marys (1923)
 The Wonderful Adventure (1924)
 Carlos and Elisabeth (1924)
 Man Against Man (1924)
 Unmarried Daughters (1926)
 Nanette Makes Everything (1926)
 A Modern Dubarry (1927)
 Always Be True and Faithful (1927)
 Heaven on Earth (1927)
 Odette (1928)
 Dyckerpotts' Heirs (1928)
 The Singing City (1930)
 The First Mrs. Fraser (1932)
 The Camels Are Coming (1934)
 Forbidden Territory (1934)
 Heat Wave (1935)
 Fighting Stock (1935)
 Pagliacci (1936)
 Rhodes of Africa (1936)
 For Valour (1937)
 The Lilac Domino (1937)
 Under Secret Orders (1937)
 Keep Smiling (1938)
 The Ware Case (1938)
 Let's Be Famous (1939)

References

Bibliography
 Bergfelder, Tim & Cargnelli, Christian. Destination London: German-speaking emigrés and British cinema, 1925-1950. Berghahn Books, 2008.

External links
 

1880 births
1938 deaths
Austrian art directors
Film people from Vienna
Austrian emigrants to England